Cyperus betchei is a sedge of the family Cyperaceae that is native to Australia.

Description
The nutlet is noticeably beaked. It produces compound inflorescences that have four to seven primary branches that have a length of about  containing loosely packed spiky clusters.

Similar species
It is very similar to Cyperus angustatus, but differs from that species by being more robust, with broader leaves with a rough keel. Also, the darker, shinier spikelets are distinct and spicate, and always fall off when ripe, when in development they have a small, very acuminate beak. The winged rachilla projects.

Taxonomy
The species was first collected in January 1883 in Narrabri, a town in the Australian state of New South Wales, by the German botanist Ernst Betche.

Subsequently, this holotype specimen was kept at the National Herbarium of Victoria and ignored for over half a century, until 1936, when Georg Kükenthal first described it as a variety of Cyperus angustatus in Engler's Das Pflanzenreich. Soon afterwards, in his article 1940 Notes on Australian Cyperaceae, III, published in the Proceedings of the Royal Society of Queensland, the botanist Stanley Thatcher Blake gave his opinion that the taxon should better be regarded as a full species, and formally promoted it to such, giving a somewhat revised and expanded treatment. The basionym is thus Kükenthal's C. angustatus var. betchei, which is now regarded as a homotypic synonym.

Both Kükenthal and Blake classified C. betchei in the section pinnatae Kük., a section Blake writes he considers a "most difficult group". He writes that one should not consider his taxonomy to be the final say on the subject, finding the species in this group a confusing lot (Blake mentions C. angustatus, C. betchei, C. carinatus, C. clarus, C. dactylotes, C. fulvus, C. gilesii, C. oxycarpus, C. perangustus and C. rigidellus), but that he was merely trying to advance our understanding of these sedges.

There are two known subspecies:
 Cyperus betchei subsp. betchei
 Cyperus betchei subsp. commiscens K.L.Wilson 1991

Distribution
In Western Australia it is found in the Kimberley, Pilbara and Goldfields-Esperance regions. It is also found in seasonally wet areas through the Northern Territory, Queensland and New South Wales.

Ecology
It grows in sandy-loamy soils in Western Australia. It grows in drier regions, with wet seasons.

See also
List of Cyperus species

References

Plants described in 1940
Flora of Western Australia
Flora of the Northern Territory
Flora of Queensland
Flora of New South Wales
betchei